John McMaster (born 23 February 1955) is a Scottish former professional footballer who played for the bulk of his career with Aberdeen.

McMaster made 316 appearances (47 as substitute) and scored 20 goals for Aberdeen and secured multiple winners medals between 1974 and 1986, including the European Cup Winners' Cup in 1983, two Scottish League titles and three Scottish Cups.

McMaster had to be given the kiss of life during a Scottish League Cup game against Rangers on 3 September 1980 after Willie Johnston stamped on his neck at Ibrox Stadium, and he was badly injured against Liverpool in the European Cup a month later, which kept him out of the game for a year.

In 1987, he signed for his hometown club Morton before retiring to become assistant manager of the club, during which he developed several players including future Aberdeen manager Derek McInnes. He has since worked as a scout for Swansea City in the west of Scotland.

In November 2017, he was one of four inductees into the Aberdeen Hall of Fame.

Career statistics

Club

Appearances and goals by club, season and competition

References

External links
 
 Profile and stats at AFC Heritage Trust

1955 births
Living people
Scottish footballers
Footballers from Greenock
Port Glasgow F.C. players
Peterhead F.C. players
Aberdeen F.C. players
Greenock Morton F.C. players
Scottish Junior Football Association players
Highland Football League players
Scottish Football League players
Greenock Morton F.C. non-playing staff
Swansea City A.F.C. non-playing staff
Association football midfielders
Association football scouts